The 1945 Wake Forest Demon Deacons football team was an American football team that represented Wake Forest University during the 1945 college football season. In its ninth season under head coach Peahead Walker, the team compiled a 5–3–1 record, finished in second place in the Southern Conference, defeated South Carolina in the first Gator Bowl game, and was ranked No. 19 in the final AP Poll.

The team defeated No. 16 Clemson in the final game of the regular season, and its three losses were to teams that were ranked in the final AP Poll: No. 1 Army, No. 13 Duke, and No. 14 Tennessee.

Five Wake Forest players were recognized the Associated Press on the 1946 All-Southern Conference football team: backs Nick Sacrinty (first team), Richard Brinkley (second team), and Nick Ognivich (third team); end John O'Quinn (third team); and guard Robert Leonetti (third team).

The team played its home games at Groves Stadium in Wake Forest, North Carolina.

Schedule

References

Wake Forest
Wake Forest Demon Deacons football seasons
Gator Bowl champion seasons
Wake Forest Demon Deacons football